Club Universitario de Deportes, popularly known as Universitario or simply as La "U", is a Peruvian football club located in Lima. The club was founded in 1924 under the name Federación Universitaria by students of the National University of San Marcos but was forced to rename in 1931. Since 1928, the club competes in the top tier of Peruvian football, the Torneo Descentralizado. In 2000, they opened the 85,000-capacity stadium Estadio Monumental, currently the largest stadium in Peru and second-largest in South America, retiring their smaller Estadio Teodoro Lolo Fernández. Universitario and Alianza Lima participate in the Peruvian Clásico, which has its roots in the club's first participation in the Primera División in 1928. It also has rivalries with Sporting Cristal, Deportivo Municipal, and Sport Boys.

The club won its first Peruvian title in 1929, one year after its debut in the first division. The club won its first double in the 1945 and 1946 seasons and won its only treble after conquering the 2000 season. Since then, Universitario has won twenty-six first division titles becoming the most succesfull club in Peru and was the first Peruvian club to reach the final of the Copa Libertadores. Universitario is one of the two most popular teams in Peru. Universitario's youth team is U América FC which currently participates in the Copa Perú. According to the International Federation of Football History and Statistics, an international organization recognized by FIFA, Universitario was the best Peruvian club of the 20th century and the 28th most successful in South America.

History

Foundation & early years (1924–1927)
The club was founded on 7 August 1924 as Federación Universitaria by students and professors of the National University of San Marcos such as José Rubio, the first president, and Dr. Luis Málaga, the creator of the club crest. Others present during the foundation were Plácido Galindo, Eduardo Astengo, Mario de las Casas, Alberto Denegri, Luis de Souza Ferreira and Andrés Rotta. At first, Federacion Universitaria was a small league that held tournaments between the faculty departments of the university.

The National Sports Committee (El Comité Nacional de Deportes)—the highest-ranking sports committee of Peru at the time—recognized Federación Universitaria as an official league; along with other small leagues in Lima and Callao. They all joined the Peruvian Football Federation. Although there was no requirement to play a tournament to be promoted to the Primera División, the club did not play in it between 1924 and 1927. During this period it only played friendly matches with other teams.

The amateur era (1928–1950)
In 1928, the Peruvian Football Federation allowed the club to enter the Peruvian Primera División, the country's premier division. The club surprised opposing and supporting fans that year because they were the runners-up of the season. During that season, on 23 September 1928, Universitario played the first clásico with Alianza Lima, the defending champion of the season, and won 1–0. However, the team lost to Alianza in an end-of-season play-off for the league title after drawing 1–1 in the first leg and losing 2–0 in the second leg. The following year Universitario won its first season title and was crowned Peruvian champion, preventing los Blanquiazules from winning a third consecutive title.

In 1931, the rector of the university, José Antonio Encinas, forbade the club to use the name Federación Universitaria. As a result, the club changed its name to Club Universitario de Deportes retaining the symbolic "U" in their name. In that same year, 18-year-old Teodoro Fernández, historically known as "Lolo" Fernández, debuted as a regular player of the team in an international friendly against the Deportes Magallanes of Chile.

Universitario's second title, in 1934, generated controversy because according to the season regulations, the season champion would be determined by the points earned by the senior teams and a fraction of the respective reserve teams. Under these regulations, Alianza Lima would be league champions; however, both senior teams had individually attained six wins, one draw, and one loss and the determining factor was the points obtained in the reserve league. Universitario's officials asked that a play-off between the first division teams be played in order to determine the season champion. Alianza Lima agreed to the play-off match and was subsequently won by Universitario with a score of 2–1. But according to other sources, this title Universitario won was not the league title itself, but a secondary title; thus creating controversy. Because of that, Alianza Lima considered itself as the champion of this year. However, the Peruvian Football Federation and the Sports Association of Professional Football, both recognize the title of this year belong to Universitario. Furthermore, in 2012, FIFA published an article in which Universitario appears holding the 1934 championship.

The 1941 season included eight clubs and was played in 2 legs. However, by the twelfth round, the tournament was suspended due to participation of the national team in the South American Championship. Once the season resumed, Universitario de Deportes reached the title after winning their last two games against Atlético Chalaco and Alianza Lima, 1–0 and 3–1 respectively.  Back-to-back titles in 1945 and 1946, led to the club's first bicampeonato thanks to the offensive trio formed by Víctor Espinoza, Teodoro Fernández and his brother Eduardo Fernández; the three players accounted for 41 goals. The following season, in its worst performance in the amateur era, finished in a mediocre eighth place with Sporting Tabaco and only staved off relegation because both teams refused to play a play-off match to determine the relegated team. Hence, the organizing association of the time decided to suspend relegation for the season. In 1949, the club celebrated its twenty-fifth anniversary by winning the championship after winning its last match against Atlético Chalaco 4–3.

In 1950, the last championship in the amateur era took place, where La U finished fifth after nine wins, two draws and seven defeats. They finished with seven league titles, one less than Alianza Lima, which held the most titles at the end of the amateur era.

The professional era (1951–present)

Professional football came to Peru in 1951, when the Peruvian Football Federation adapted the championship according to the global guidelines for a professional league, but only with the participation of clubs located in the city of Lima and Province of Callao. The club debuted in the professional era with a win over Mariscal Sucre FBC with a score of 4–1. On 20 July 1952, the inauguration of Teodoro Lolo Fernandez stadium took place, with sporting facilities and a spectator stand which previously belonged to the first national stadium of the country. At the opening, Universitario beat Universidad de Chile by 4–2, with three goals scored by Teodoro Fernández himself. In 1954 Plácido Galindo took the club's presidency, in what was the first of his three administrations at the helm of the institution. Throughout this decade, the club conducted irregular campaigns in the newly professional league, which saw titles shared between Alianza Lima, Sport Boys, Mariscal Sucre, Sporting Cristal, and Centro Iqueño. The title drought of the fifties ended in 1959 when they won their eighth crown, after tying 3–3 with Deportivo Municipal in the final match, totaling fifteen wins, three draws and four losses.

In the 1960s, the club's successes were the greatest yet after winning five more championships. The first of them in 1960 after a scoreless draw with Sport Boys, totaling eleven wins, three draws and four defeats in eighteen games; hence achieving its second bicampeonato. As 1960 champion, Universitario was the first Peruvian club to qualify to the first Copa de Campeones de América, the first edition of the Copa Libertadores. On 19 April 1961, the club debuted in South America's premier competition in Montevideo, Uruguay against Peñarol, which ended in a loss of 5–0. After finishing third place in two consecutive season, Universitario rose again with the title in 1964, nine points ahead of second place. At the end of 1965, the Peruvian Football Federation expanded the professional league to the entire country by creating the first national tournament as the Torneo Descentralizado, or Decentralized Tournament. In 1966, the first Descentralizado was played. Under the leadership of manager Marcos Calderón, became the first national champion after nineteen wins, three draws and four defeats. In 1967, Universitario successfully defended its crown, winning its third bicampeonato. On 27 February 1968 in the Copa Libertadores, Universitario achieved its biggest win in Copa Libertadores against Always Ready of Bolivia by 6–0. The club finished the decade with a third national title after drawing 1–1 with Atlético Grau in the league final.

1972 Copa Libertadores

In 1971, Universitario won its fourteenth First División title and qualified for the 1972 edition of the Copa Libertadores under the Uruguayan head coach Roberto Scarone along with Alianza Lima who placed second that season. They were grouped with the Chilean teams Unión San Felipe and Universidad de Chile in Group 4. Universitario's first game was the Peruvian Superclásico which it won 2–1. The following game was held in Santiago de Chile against Universidad de Chile where it lost 1–0. Universitario later tied with the other Chilean team in Santiago. Universitario returned to Lima to face Alianza Lima again where they tied 2–2. At that point, Universitario and Universidad de Chile had accumulated 4 points while Alianza Lima and Unión San Felipe had 3. Universitario won the remaining games against the Chilean teams in Lima, obtaining 8 points and qualifying for the next round.

Universitario was grouped with the Uruguayan clubs Peñarol—a three-time winner of the Copa Libertadores—and Nacional—the previous edition's winner—in the semi-final group stage. La U started off losing their first match against Peñarol in Lima. In that match, La U did not play with five of their starting players because they were called to play for the Peru national football team. However, they won the following game against Nacional 3–0. They then visited both teams in Montevideo tying both games, 3–3 against Nacional and 1–1 against Peñarol. Universitario had accumulated 4 points and there was only one game left between Peñarol and Nacional, which had 4 and 2 points respectively. All three teams had a chance of qualifying for the next round. Peñarol only needed a win but Nacional needed a win by 5 goals. The game ended 3–0 in favor of Nacional allowing Universitario to qualify for the final round where they would face Independiente.

The first leg of the final was played in Lima where they tied 0–0. The game in Argentina ended 2–1 in favor of the Argentines; Percy Rojas scored the late goal for Universitario. This was Percy Rojas' sixth goal in the tournament. He, along with Oswaldo Ramírez, Teófilo Cubillas, and Toninho, were the top-scorers. Although Universitario lost, they had achieved something a Peruvian club had never before, reach the final of the Copa Libertadores, the most prestigious international competition in South America.

Two years later, in 1974, the club celebrated its 50th anniversary, created a football school for minors and finished the year as champion under the leadership of Argentine Juan Eduardo Hohberg.

The regional tournaments (1980–1991)
The 1980s of Peruvian football began to see notable changes in the competition format. The 1982 season saw the tournament played in group stages. Universitario advanced from its Metropolitan Group to Group B of the second stage and finally to the four-team group final, known as the Liguilla. Universitario successfully defeated all of its opponents in the Liguilla and reached its sixteenth first division title. The decisive victory was against Deportivo Municipal after a lone goal by Hugo Gastulo. In 1985, José Luis Carranza, to become an important icon of the club, debuted on the first team. Universitario won the Torneo Regional, or Regional Tournament, of the early season successfully remained at the top of the league by advancing to the Liguilla by placing second in the Torneo Descentrlizado and conquering the Liguilla by winning all five matches played, the last of which was a 4–0 win over Los Espartanos de Pacasmayo with goals by Miguel Seminario, Fidel Suárez, Eduardo Rey Muñoz and Jaime Drago. As Universitario won both tournaments of the season, they were automatically declared 1985 champions. Universitario de Deportes returned to the top of Peruvian football in 1987. As in 1985, Universitario began the season by winning the Regional Tournament, which put them in the season final to face off the winner of the Descentralizado for the national title. The Descentralizado went to their classic rival, Alianza Lima which meant the season final would be contested as another edition of the Clásico. Also, both Universitario and Alianza Lima reached the final with seventeen first division titles under their belts. The defining derby was won by Universitario with a single goal by Fidel Suárez, overcoming the tie they had in the most Peruvian titles. In 1990, with the arrival of Fernando Cuellar as coach, Universitario de Deportes won the First Regional Tournament of the season, automatically advancing to the season final where they faced Sport Boys, winner of the Second Regional Tournament.

The mid-nineties (1992–1997)
In the year 1992, the national championship regulations were generally amended again by dropping the regional tournaments and returning to a similar system before the 1980s where the clubs would first play in a league and subsequently advance to the Liguilla. The club won the title a week before the final round, after defeating CD San Agustín 4–1, with goals two goals from Ronald Baroni and the remaining coming from César Charún and José Luis Carranza. With Sergio Markarián in charge of the first team, la U defended its title in 1993, achieving a new bicampeonato for the club. The defining match that gave Universitario its twenty-first title was a 3–0 over San Agustín; two goals were scored by Jorge Amado Nunes and one by Roberto Martinez. This was the fourth time in the club's history that it won back-to-back titles.

The treble (1998–2000)
By winning in 1998, 1999, and 2000, Universitario won their first treble or Tricampeonato. The 1998 title was won under Oswaldo Piazza, Miguel Company and Roberto Challe led the club to the other two titles. It was the third Peruvian team to do this; the first being in the amateur era won by Alianza Lima and the second in the early nineties by Sporting Cristal. It was also during the 2000 season that they were the second Peruvian club to win an Apertura and Clausura in a single season; the first being Alianza Lima in 1997. In the Copa Libertadores, Universitario made it to the Round of 16 in 1998 but lost to Vélez Sársfield. In 1999 and 2000 they failed to advance past the group stage. Universitario also participated in all four editions of the Copa Merconorte between 1999 and 2001 but did not have a lot of success, being eliminated in the group stage all four times.

Recent decade (2001–2010)

Universitario saw little success after its Tricampeonato. In 2002, Universitario beat Alianza Lima in the Apertura two-legged play-off but were unable to finish in the top four of the 2002 Clausura and were ineligible to dispute the national title. In 2005, Universitario placed first on the aggregate table and qualified for the 2006 Copa Libertadores, where they won on away goals against Nacional in the first phase of the tournament, however, they were eliminated in the group stage. Universitario continually failed to win a twenty-fifth national title but qualified to the Copa Sudamericana in 2007 and 2008. In both editions, they were eliminated in the first stage.

Minor success came in 2008 when Ricardo Gareca led Universitario to an Apertura tournament. The last time they won an Apertura title was in 2002. They won the tournament on their twenty-second game 10 points ahead of Sporting Cristal and four games away from the end of the Apertura. They defeated Cienciano 3–1 to secure first place and accumulated 50 points to win the title. They qualified for the 2009 Copa Libertadores but did not finish in the top seven of the Clausura and consequently could not contest the season final for the national title against Universidad San Martín. In 2009, following the resignation of Ricardo Gareca the club hired Juan Reynoso as the new manager, a former player of the club in the 90s and with a long history in the Mexican football. Much of the 2008 squad remained for the 2009 season, but with the departure of some notable players like Héctor Hurtado, Mayer Candelo and Donny Neyra. The most important signing prior to the 2009 season was Nolberto Solano. Other players to arrive were Carlos Orejuela, John Galliquio, Piero Alva, Francisco Bazán, Rodolfo Espinoza, and Ronaille Calheira. Reynoso intelligently led Universitario to the season final which would be a repeat of the 1987 final in which they would face arch-rival Alianza Lima. Universitario won both legs; in the first leg they won 1–0 with a goal from Piero Alva in and in the second leg Nolberto Solano scored the defining goal from the penalty mark in the tenth minute of play. As of 2009, Universitario has twenty-five Primera División titles. The first seven titles won by Universitario were during the amateur era. The remaining eighteen titles were won during the professional era, the most any Peruvian club has.

The balance of the 2009 tournament could not be better, as the Universitario had the highest cumulative score, claimed victory in the four super clásicos of the year, and ensured their participation in the Copa Libertadores 2010.

In the continental tournament "la U" was part of Group 4 of the Copa Libertadores 2010 with Blooming, Lanús from Argentina and Libertad. In the first game scored an away victory to Blooming 2–1. A week later defeated by a score of 2–0 to Lanús and then tied 0–0 with Libertad, this meeting was the number 200 in the history of the club in the Copa Libertadores.

Universitario ended his participation in the group stage with three more draws for a total of 10 points, and alongside Brazilian teams Internacional and São Paulo became the best defenders in the tournament to receive only two goals against. Coincidentally, the São Paulo was the merengue's rival in the knockout stage, both matches ended 0–0 so the winner was decided by penalty kicks resulting in the Brazilian club winning 3–1. La U left the Cup undefeated, having achieved 2 wins and 6 draws,

Meanwhile, in the league the club had its worst season start in history after being defeated during the first three games of the season. The team quickly recovered with three straight wins and not again suffer defeat until the twelfth journey when they lost by 1:0 before the León de Huánuco in visitor status. Once again a number of problems dirigenciales and constant technical changes not allowed the team to fulfill a good season. During the first part of the tournament the Chamber of Conciliation and Dispute Resolution Peruvian Football Federation took away two points for having an outstanding debt to Ricardo Gareca and finished in fifth place with 51 points product of 16 wins, 5 draws and 9 defeats. In the second stage championship of the "U" joined the league odd in which it scored 5 wins and 6 ties for a total of 72 points and obtain the qualification for the Copa Sudamericana 2011.

Colors and badge

Universitario's colors are cream (crema in Spanish), burgundy (granate in Spanish), and black. When playing a home game they use the cream-colored kit with black socks and when playing away they use the burgundy-colored kit with black socks.

The club's colors at first were not cream. They started out with a white kit which had the badge on the chest. During one of their early seasons, Universitario could not participate in an upcoming match because their uniforms had been sent to the laundry to be washed. The managers pleaded that they hurry with the laundry and they quickly washed them. However, when the club received the jerseys, they found that they were no longer white, but yellow. The laundry workers had forgotten to remove the badges from the jerseys and consequently the red color from the badges mixed with the white jerseys giving it a yellow tint. The club had no choice but to use the jersey to play. They managed to win that game and a few others as well and thus the club kept the new-colored kit as a good-luck charm.

The badge is a red U inside a deep-red circle drawn by Luis Malaga, one of the founders of the club.

Stadium

Universitario's first stadium was Estadio Lolo Fernandez. It had a capacity of 15,000. Its capacity was reduced to 4,000 and now serves as a football academy for its club members and hosts football games for the Segunda División reserve team América Cochahuayco and youth teams in the youth divisions. It was built in honor of Teodoro "Lolo" Fernandez, Universitario's most revered player.

Estadio Monumental is a stadium that was built by the Peruvian construction company Gremco throughout the 1990s and opened in 2000, replacing Estadio Lolo Fernandez and the Nacional. The inauguration game was between Universitario and Sporting Cristal; Universitario won 2–0. It was given to Universitario the same year it was opened and they now own the largest stadium in Peru with a capacity of 85,000. This stadium is the third largest in South America. Its eastern and western stands are all-seaters and its northern and southern stands have standing terraces. Exactly 1,251 luxury boxes, known as palcos, are above the stands.

The stadium was deemed not fit to host the classic derby between Universitario and Alianza Lima between 2002 and 2007 by the Peruvian Police. The first time this stadium hosted the derby was on 26 June 2002—the first leg of the Apertura play-off—where Universitario won 1–0. Alianza's fans, in the southern stand, reacted violently to the loss by vandalizing the premises and causing two reported stabbings. Consequently, La U was forced to play all future derbies at Estadio Nacional where the Instituto Peruano del Deporte installed artificial turf which is constantly criticized by the First Division players. For the next five years this derby was not played at this stadium. On 14 September 2008, the derby returned to the Estadio Monumental with a loss for Universitario.

This stadium was rejected as a venue for the Copa América 2004 because of problems with Alfredo Gonzalez, President of Universitario de Deportes, and the stadium's owners. Many saw this as a typical bullying behavior on the part of the president since this stadium would have been the perfect venue to host the 2004 Copa América intro as well as final games.

Supporters
Universitario's supporters are one of the largest in Peru, only rivaled by Alianza Lima's supporters. Universitario's ultra groups are known as Barra Oriente and Trinchera Norte. Asociación Barra Dale U, the official name of the Barra Oriente, started in 1968 that notably grew over the years. Trinchera Norte is a barra brava that was formed in 1988; in contrast to Alianza Lima's supporters, named "Comando Svr", "Sicarios", and others.

The two most popular teams in Peru are Universitario and Alianza Lima. They are at the top of the polls conducted by many different groups. The group Apoyo, Opinion y Mercado in 2006 revealed that Alianza Lima was popular amongst 35%, followed by Universitario, with 32%. In 2005, a study by Grupo de Opinión Pública de la Universidad de Lima showed that Universitario was the most popular team in Lima and Callao with 31.7% followed by Alianza Lima with 29.3%. However, in 2006 and 2007 Alianza Lima appeared first in their polls. There was a narrow margin in 2007 as Alianza Lima reached 29.6% and Universitario followed with 29.5% under a margin of error of ±4.16% In 2009, the university's results varied because Alianza reached first with 40% and Universitario second with 35.5% under a margin of error of ±4.47%. Another group known as CPI, revealed in May 2008 that Universitario was favored by 32% whilst Alianza Lima was favored by 33.5% under a margen of error of 2.7% at the national level. This report was divided into two parts. In the metropolitan capital, Universitario led with 42.8% and Alianza tailed behind with 39.9%. In the rest of the country, Universitario had a larger lead with 31.5% opposed to Alianza's 24.1%. In 2009, CPI released another poll indicating the Universitario was still the most popular team in Peru with 38.6% while Alianza reached 33.1%. A survey conducted by Grupo de Opinión Pública de la Universidad de Lima in February 2009, said that Alianza Lima ranked first in popularity with 27.2%; Universitario second with 26.6%. However, a second poll released by the same university group in September of the same year ranked Universitario first with 37.9% and Alianza second with 36.6%. The most recent report from the group indicates that Universitario has more sympathizers than Alianza with 40.6% over 36.% in the Province of Lima and Callao. In 2010, South American Football Confederation (Conmebol) stated that Universitario is the most popular team in Perú.

Women's team
The women's team won 9 Peruvian Primera División Femenina. It represented Peru at the Copa Libertadores Femenina in 2021 and finished third in their group.

Liga Femenina: 
Runner-up (1): 2021

Campeonato Nacional de Fútbol Femenino:
Winners (4): 2015, 2016, 2016–17, 2019

Campeonato Metropolitano de Fútbol Femenino:
Winners (5): 1996, 1997, 2001, 2002, 2003

Players

Current squad

Retired numbers

 9 –  Teodoro "Lolo" Fernández, forward (1930–53) – Number retired since the 2013 season.
 22 –  José Luis Carranza, midfielder (1986–04)

Out on loan
Tiago Cantoro at Cusco FC for the 2023 season.

Technical staff

Noted managers

Seventeen managers won at least one major trophy with the club but only fourteen won the Primera División. Arturo Fernández and Marcos Calderon won a record four major titles with the club. Roberto Scarone won 3 first division titles and also led the club to its first Copa Libertadores final in 1972. Universitario's first manager, Mario de las Casas, led the club to its first championship as a player-manager. Jack Greenwell, the club's only English manager in its history, won the club's second first division title and went on to succeed with the Peru national football team.

Three managers—Miguel Company, Ángel Cappa, and Ricardo Gareca—won a Torneo Apertura trophy but did not win the national championship. Company left the team shortly after winning the 1999 Torneo Apertura whilst Cappa resigned from his position after winning the 2002 Torneo Apertura due to financial difficulties in the club. Gareca was unable to reach the final championship match because of a string of poor results in the 2008 Torneo Clausura.

Other managers
 Ramón Quiroga (1993)
 Freddy Ternero (1993)
 Manuel Keosseián (1994)
 Eduardo Luján Manera (1996)
 Javier Chirinos (interim) (2001)
 Osvaldo Piazza (2002)
 Javier Chirinos (interim) (2002)
 Ricardo "Tato" Ortiz (2003)
 Javier Chirinos (interim) (2003)
 Ramón Quiroga (2003)
 Oscar Malbernat (2004)
 Marcelo Trobbiani (2004)
 José Basualdo (2005)
 Jorge Amado Nunes (2007)
 Ricardo Gareca (2008)
 Juan Reynoso Guzmán (2009–10)
 Salvador Capitano (2010)
 Javier Chirinos (interim) (2010)
 José del Solar (2010–11)
 Nolberto Solano (2012)
 Ángel Comizzo (2013–14)
 José del Solar (2014)
 Óscar Ibáñez (2014–15)
 Luis Fernando Suárez (2015)
 Roberto Challe (2015–17)
 Pedro Troglio (2017–18)
 Nicolás Córdova (2018–2019)
 Ángel Comizzo (2019)
 Gregorio Perez (2020)
 Ángel Comizzo (2020–2021)
 Gregorio Perez (2021)
 Alvaro Gutierrez (2022)
 Carlos Compagnucci (2022- act)

Honours

National

League
Peruvian Primera División:
Winners (26): 1929, 1934,  1939, 1941, 1945, 1946, 1949, 1959, 1960, 1964, 1966, 1967, 1969, 1971, 1974, 1982, 1985, 1987, 1990, 1992, 1993, 1998, 1999, 2000, 2009, 2013

Runner-up (15): 1928, 1932, 1933, 1940, 1955, 1965, 1970, 1972, 1978, 1984, 1988, 1995, 2002, 2008, 2020

Torneo Apertura:
Winners (6): 1998, 1999, 2000, 2002, 2008, 2016
Runner-up (2): 1969, 2005

Torneo Clausura:
Winners (1): 2000
Runner-up (6): 1997, 1999, 2006, 2007, 2016, 2019

 Fase 1:
Winners (1): 2020

Torneo Regional:
Winners (4): 1985, 1987, 1988, 1990-II
Runner-up (3): 1981, 1989-II, 1990-I

National cups
Torneo Plácido Galindo:
Runner-up (1): 1989

Copa Presidente de la República: 
Winners (1): 1970

Under-20 team
Torneo de Promoción y Reserva:
Winners (2): 2014-I, 2015-I
Runner-up (2): 2014-II, 2016

International
Copa Libertadores: 
Runner-up (1): 1972

International youth
U-20 Copa Libertadores: 1
Winners (1): 2011

Ranking
Club Ranking for 2010–11 (Previous year rank in italics, IFFHS Club Coefficients in parentheses)

 57  (42)  Shakhtar Donetsk (153)
 58  (72)  Manchester City (150)
 59  (62)  Universitario de Deportes (150)
 60  (67)  FC Twente (148.5)
 61  (62)  FK Partizan (148)

Records
Seasons in Primera División: 94 (1928–2022) (Peruvian football's longest consecutive spell in Primera División)
Record Primera División victory: 9–0 v. Atlético Torino (19 September 1970)
Record Copa Libertadores victory: 6–0 v. Always Ready (27 Feb 1968)
Record Primera División defeat: 2 matches:
1–9 v. Alianza Lima (12 June 1949)
0–6 v. Deportivo Municipal (1937)
Record Copa Libertadores defeat: 0–6 v. Rosario Central (21 Feb 2001)
Longest unbeaten run: 36, 27 May 1974 to 27 February 1975 (Peruvian football's longest unbeaten run) 
Most appearances overall: 524, José Luis Carranza 1986–04
Most goals scored in a season: 37, Eduardo Esidio 1998–00
Most goals scored overall: 156, Teodoro "Lolo" Fernández 1930–53
Most Primera División titles as player: 7, Ángel Uribe, Luis Cruzado, José Luis Carranza 
Most Primera División titles as manager: 4, Arturo Fernández, Marcos Calderón

Year-by-year 

This is a partial list of the last five seasons completed by Universitario. For the full season-by-season history, see List of Universitario de Deportes seasons.

Average home attendances of Universitario de Deportes

2017 Verano: 10,807
2017 Apertura: 10,729
2016 Clausura: 15,107
2016: Apertura: 14,105

See also
List of Club Universitario de Deportes players
Club Universitario de Deportes in South American football
Club Universitario de Deportes–Sporting Cristal rivalry

Notes

References

External links
Official Website
DALEUCAMPEON Statistics and pictures 

 
Association football clubs established in 1924
Football clubs in Lima
1924 establishments in Peru
Unrelegated association football clubs